This is the order of battle for the Operation Perch, a World War II operation between British and German forces in Normandy, France between June 6 and June 19, 1944.

British Order of Battle

21st Army Group
General Officer Commanding-in-Chief: General Sir Bernard Montgomery
Chief of the General Staff: Freddie de Guingand

Second Army
General Officer Commanding-in-Chief: Lieutenant-General Miles Dempsey

I Corps
Lieutenant-General John Crocker

51st (Highland) Infantry Division - Major-General Bullen-Smith
4th Armoured Brigade

XXX Corps
Lieutenant-General Gerard Bucknall

7th Armoured Division - Major-General George Erskine
49th (West Riding) Infantry Division - Major-General Evelyn Barker
50th (Northumbrian) Infantry Division - Major-General Douglas Graham
8th Armoured Brigade

German order of battle

I SS Panzer Corps
SS-Obergruppenführer Sepp Dietrich

Panzer-Lehr-Division
12th SS Panzer Division Hitlerjugend
21st Panzer Division
Heavy SS Panzer Battalion 101

III Flak Corps

XLVII Panzer Corps

2nd Panzer Division

LXXXIV Korps

352nd Infantry Division
716th Static Infantry Division

See also

List of orders of battle

Notes
Footnotes

Citations

References

World War II orders of battle
Battle for Caen
Perch
Military operations of World War II involving Germany